Har Ghar Jal (translation: Water To Every Household) is  a scheme initiated by the Ministry of Jal Shakti of Government of India under Jal Jeevan Mission in 2019  with the aim to provide tap water to every rural household by 2024.

History
Finance Minister Nirmala Sitharaman announced the scheme in 2019 Union budget.

Since its inception, the scheme has significantly improved household clean tap water availability in India. The government has also published website based dashboard to track the progress details of the mission.

In August 2022, Goa and Dadra and Nagar Haveli and Daman and Diu became the first 'Har Ghar Jal' certified State and UT respectively with 100% tap-water access. As of January 2023, other states and UTs of Haryana, Gujarat, Puducherry and Telangana have also achieved 100% tap-water access.

See also 

 DigiLocker (easier access to online identity proof and services)
 One Nation, One Ration Card (food security card's national portability)
 Pradhan Mantri Awas Yojana (affordable housing for all)
 Saubhagya electrification scheme (electrification for all houses)
 Swachh Bharat (sanitation mission)
 Ujjwala Yojana (clean cooking gas connections for all)

References

Water in India
Government schemes in India
Modi administration initiatives